George Thacher (July 25, 1817 – December 27, 1878) was the fifth President of the University of Iowa, serving from 1871 to 1877.

Thacher, son of Peter and Anne (Parks) Thacher, was born in Hartford, Conn., July 25, 1817. He was the brother of Yale Administrator & Professor of Latin Thomas Anthony Thacher

He graduated from Yale College in 1840.  He studied for three years in the Yale Divinity School, and began preaching in June, 1843, in the Congregational Church in Derby, Conn., where he was ordained pastor, Jan. 4, 1844.  From this charge he was dismissed, Oct. 10, 1848, to accept a call to the Congregational Church in Nantucket, Mass., over which he was settled from Nov. 14, 1848, to May 14, 1850. He was then installed, May 26, 1850, over the Allen St. Presbyterian Church in New York City, of which he continued pastor until his resignation, Oct. 9, 1854. His succeeding pastorates were the 1st Congregational Church, Meriden, Conn. (Nov. 16, 1854-Sept. 18, 1860), and the Orthodox Congregational Church, Keokuk, Iowa (Oct 30, 1860—Apr 8, 1867). He then spent some months in Europe, and in October, 1868, took temporary charge of the church in Waterloo, Iowa. From this service he was called to the Presidency of the State University of Iowa, which office he filled from April, 1871, till June, 1877. He then took charge of the Congregational Church in Iowa City, but the state of his health, which had caused his resignation of the presidency, put an end to his public work in the following March. He returned shortly after to the East, to die among his kindred.  He died in Hartford of disease of the brain, and heart, Dec. 27, 1878, aged 61 years.

He was married, in April, 1844, to Sarah M., daughter of Rev. Noah Smith (Dartmouth Coll. 1818), of South Britain, Conn.  After her death (July 12, 1850), he was married, Aug. 27, 1851, to her younger sister, Mary S. Smith, who survived him.  His children—two by the first marriage, and one by the second— died before him.

The degree of Doctor of Divinity was conferred on him, both by Knox College and by Iowa College, in 1871.

External links
 Iowa Alumni Magazine profile

Presidents of the University of Iowa
1817 births
1878 deaths
Educators from Hartford, Connecticut
Yale Divinity School alumni
American Congregationalist ministers
American Presbyterian ministers
Yale College alumni
19th-century American educators
19th-century American clergy